Wang Ming-chen (November 18, 1906 – August 28, 2010) was a Chinese theoretical physicist and a professor at Tsinghua University, Beijing. As one of the first few Chinese female students studying science abroad, she was best known for her work on stochastic process and Brownian motion with George Uhlenbeck as well as the first female professor of Tsinghua University according to some source.

Wang Ming-chen and her cousin He Zehui were sometimes separately credited as "The Chinese Madame Curie".

Biography
Wang was born into a large prominent family in Suzhou, Jiangsu Province on November 18, 1906 (or the 3rd day of the 10th month of year Bingwu / the 32nd year of Guangxu in the Qing dynasty of the Chinese Lunar Calendar) Her siblings include several renowned Chinese scientists, physicians, and engineers, who pursued western education in the early 1900s. Wang was also among the first Chinese female students, who received undergraduate education in Christian schools Ginling College, Nanjing (first and second year) and the Yanjing University, Beijing (third and last year). She also received her master's degree from Yanjing University in 1932.

According to her own autobiography, after missing two scholarship opportunities from Barbour Scholars, the University of Michigan and Sino-British Boxer Indemnity Scholarship to study physics abroad because she was unable to afford the transportation and gender discrimination, she eventually arrived at the US to study theoretical physics at the University of Michigan in 1938, under another application of Barbour Scholars. She taught at Ginling College from circa 1932 to circa 1937, but fled Nanjing for Wuhan on the eve of Japanese invasion of the city (see Nanking Massacre). She moved to the Shanghai branch of Ginling College circa January 1938.

She received her PhD in 1942 in the University of Michigan and published several papers in the area of statistical mechanics with George Uhlenbeck and Samuel Goudsmit. During the war time (1943–1945), she worked on noise in MIT Radiation Laboratory. It was then she published the paper "On the Theory of the Brownian Motion II" with Uhlenbeck. James L. Lawson and Uhlenbeck also acknowledged Wang in the preface of Threshold Signals, a book from the MIT Radiation Laboratory Series, which published the researches of the lab.

After the war, she returned to China in 1946 and became a professor of the mathematics and physics department at Yunnan University from 1947 to 1949. She married scholar Yu Qizhong in 1948. In 1949, due to the Chinese Civil War, Wang decided to go back to the US and worked in the University of Notre Dame with Eugene Guth until the Korean War broke out. She resigned from Notre Dame and eventually returned to China in 1955. She was not allowed to return to China despite application was filed in circa 1953, as the US was in the McCarthyism period, as well as she had worked in sensitive research area. Nevertheless her husband was allowed to leave or stay with her from 1953 to 1955.

In 1955, Wang became a professor of physics at Tsinghua University, Beijing and taught statistical physics and thermodynamics until the Culture Revolution started in 1966. In 1966, Wang was suddenly arrested and imprisoned until 1973.

Her husband Yu was also arrested until finally being released in 1975. After the Cultural Revolution ended, the Organization Department of the Communist Party of China announced that Wang and Yu's arrest was completely unjust and was due to political persecution by Jiang Qing, then Mao's wife and a member of the Gang of Four.

Wang retired from Tsinghua in 1976 and lived in Beijing until she died in 2010.

Personal life

Wang Mingzhen's grandmother founded a girl middle school in Suzhou, a predecessor of Suzhou No.10 Middle School, of which Wang was an alumna as well as some of her family members. Wang's father, K.T. Wang, published the Wang-algebra; according to some historians, K.T. Wang's paper in the Proceedings of the Royal Irish Academy in 1911, was one of the earliest papers by a Chinese scientist to appear in a foreign journal.

Footnotes

References

Further reading

See also
 Qian Xuesen, fellow Chinese scientist who also studied in the US (MIT, Caltech) and also returned to Mainland China in 1950s

1906 births
Chinese women physicists
University of Notre Dame people
Academic staff of Tsinghua University
Yenching University alumni
University of Michigan alumni
Scientists from Suzhou
2010 deaths
Chinese centenarians
Women centenarians
Physicists from Jiangsu
Educators from Suzhou
Academic staff of Yunnan University